"Let's Get It In" is a promotional single from R&B singer Lloyd Rob Holladay and Polow Da Don are the co-producers of the track, which features rapper 50 Cent. The song was to be the second single from King of Hearts but plans was dropped and did not appear on the album. The song was released officially as a digital download on iTunes on October 25, 2010.

Background
The song was originally released on www.thisis50.com by 50 Cent on September 27, 2010, at 4:30pm.
On Twitter Lloyd reported that his second single from the album would feature an artist who he has always wanted to work with. Rumours were that it was rapper 50 Cent, this was later confirmed when he posted the song on his webpage.

Lloyd has previously stated on Twitter that he had always wanted to work with 50 Cent and create a "club banger".

Music video
The video for the single with G-Unit boss was shot in Atlanta during the BET Hip Hop Awards weekend. It premiered on December 8, 2010, at BET's 106 & Park. The video has peaked at #8 on the show. The music video is set in a night club and it is directed by Colin Tilley.

Chart position

References

External links
Lloyd Ft. 50 Cent - Let's Get it In
Let's Get It In - Lyrics Lyrics

2010 singles
Lloyd (singer) songs
50 Cent songs
Songs written by 50 Cent
Songs written by Polow da Don
Song recordings produced by Polow da Don
Music videos directed by Colin Tilley
Songs written by Lloyd (singer)